Germantown Township is one of fifteen townships in Clinton County, Illinois, USA.  As of the 2010 census, its population was 2,070 and it contained 821 housing units.

Geography

Cities, towns, villages
 Germantown

Cemeteries
The township contains these two cemeteries: Ammons and Saint Boniface.

Major highways
  Interstate 64
  Illinois Route 161

Lakes
 Buddes Lake
 Clear Lake
 Foppe Lake
 Grass Lake
 Horstmann Lake
 Moody Lake
 Olges Lake
 Round Lake
 Wilkins Lake

Demographics

Political districts
 Illinois' 19th congressional district
 State House District 107
 State Senate District 54

References
 
 United States Census Bureau 2007 TIGER/Line Shapefiles
 United States National Atlas

External links
 City-Data.com
 Illinois State Archives

Townships in Clinton County, Illinois
Townships in Illinois